Donald Albert "D. A." Weibring Jr. (born May 25, 1953) is an American professional golfer who has won numerous tournaments including several on the PGA Tour and Champions Tour.

Early life and amateur career
Weibring was born in Quincy, Illinois. His father started him playing golf at a young age. In 1975, Weibring graduated from Illinois State University with a Bachelor of Business Administration.

Professional career
Weibring turned professional in 1975. He has won five PGA Tour events. His first was in 1979 at Quad Cities — an event he would win three times. His last Tour victory was at the Canon Greater Hartford Open in 1996. Weibring had five top-10 finishes in major championships — twice at the PGA Championship, and one in each of the others.

Weibring joined the Champions Tour after turning 50 in May 2003, and has won five times thus far. In 2004, he led the Champions Tour with 15 top-10 finishes in 25 appearances including a wire-to-wire win at the Allianz Championship.

Weibring was inducted into the Illinois PGA Hall of Fame in 2001. He has his own golf course design and management company with golf course architect Steven Wolfard. He has three children: two daughters (Allison & Katey) and one son (Matt). His son was a two-time All American golfer at Georgia Tech and current player on the Web.com Tour.

Professional wins (13)

PGA Tour wins (5)

*Note: Tournament shortened to 54 holes due to weather.

PGA Tour playoff record (0–2)

Japan Golf Tour wins (1)

PGA Tour of Australasia wins (1)

Other wins (1)

Other playoff record (0–1)

Champions Tour wins (5)

Champions Tour playoff record (0–1)

Results in major championships

CUT = missed the half-way cut
"T" = tied

Summary

Most consecutive cuts made – 6 (1988 U.S. Open – 1992 Masters)
Longest streak of top-10s – 2 (1986 PGA – 1987 Masters)

Results in The Players Championship

CUT = missed the halfway cut
WD = withdrew
"T" indicates a tie for a place

Champions Tour major championships

Wins (1)

Results timeline
Results not in chronological order before 2012.

CUT = missed the halfway cut
WD = withdrew from tournament
"T" indicates a tie for a place

U.S. national team appearances
Dunhill Cup: 1987

See also 

 Spring 1977 PGA Tour Qualifying School graduates

References

External links

American male golfers
Illinois State Redbirds men's golfers
PGA Tour golfers
PGA Tour Champions golfers
Winners of senior major golf championships
Golfers from Illinois
Sportspeople from Quincy, Illinois
1953 births
Living people